No Greater Love is a 1960 film starring Evelyn Ankers and Richard Denning and is notable for being Ankers', as well as Art Linkletter's, last movie.

External links
No Greater Love at the Internet Movie Database

1960 films
American black-and-white films
1960 drama films
American drama films
1960s English-language films
1960s American films